The women's single sculls competition at the 2014 Asian Games in Chungju, South Korea was held from 20 September to 24 September at the Tangeum Lake International Rowing Center.

Schedule 
All times are Korea Standard Time (UTC+09:00)

Results

Heat
 Qualification: 1–4 → Final (FA)

Final

References

External links
 Official website

Rowing at the 2014 Asian Games